The Sackwald is a ridge, up to  high, in the Lower Saxon Hills in the district of Hildesheim in the North German state of Lower Saxony. It is named after the village of Sack in the borough of Alfeld, the name meaning "Sack Forest".

The Sackwald is part of the geological structure of the Sack Basin or Sackmulde along with the Sieben Berge and the Vorberge.

Geography 
The Sackwald lies on the eastern edge of the Leine Uplands in the Lower Saxon Hills. It is located between the town of Alfeld on the River Leine to the northwest and the rather more distant town of Bad Gandersheim to the southeast.

The Sackwald is surrounded by the ridges of the Vorberge to the north, the southeastern foothills of the Hildesheim Forest to the north-northeast, the Sauberge to the northeast, the Harplage to the east-northeast, the Heber to the east, the Helleberg to the south and southwest, the Selter (on the other side of the Leine valley) to the southwest and the Sieben Berge to the northwest.
Topographically it transitions into the last-named ridge seamlessly. Several streams rise within or on the edge of the Sackwald, whose waters eventually empty into the westward-running Leine or the northeast flowing Innerste; the ridge thus lies on the watershed between the two rivers. 

The unpopulated Sackwald is crossed by several forest tracks and hiking trails, which enable the densely forested landscape to be explored. They include the Rennstieg path that runs through the forests and the Hohe Schanze Historic Educational Path (Historische Lehrpfad Hohe Schanze). The ridge may be reached over winding state roads (Landesstraßen) branching off the B 3 and B 64 federal roads, and link, for example, Alfeld, Freden and Lamspringe with one another.

Hills 
Amongst the hills in the Sackwald are the following (heights in metres above sea level (NN)): 
 Ahrensberg (374 m) – southwest of Woltershausen and northeast of Everode
 Paradiesgarten (336 m) – north of Everode
 Teufelskirche (330 m) – north of Everode
 Saurenberg (321 m) – north-northwest of Everode
 Hohe Schanze (326 m) – east of Winzenburg, site of the ruins of a Frankish mission station
 Gehlenberg (ca. 315 m) – west-southwest of Lamspringe
 Hainholzberg (ca. 300 m) – southwest of Adenstedt on the boundary with the Vorberge
 Kratzberg (ca. 300 m) – north of Alfeld-Hörsum
 Menteberg (300 m) – east of Alfeld
 Rüstiberg (288 m) – east of Everode
 Mullenberg (278 m) – north of Everode
 Winzenberg (272 m) – northeast of Winzenburg, site of Winzenburg Castle
 Buchenberg (270 m) – north-northwest of Everode
 Feldberg (267 m) – west-southwest of Lamspringe
 Horstberg (ca. 250 m) – east-southeast of Alfeld-Hörsum
 Tiebenberg (ca. 240 m) – north of Winzenburg, site of the Tiebenburg cultural monument

Waterbodies 
Amongst the streams in or on the Sackwald are: 
 Gande, rises in the southeastern part of the Sackwald, eastern tributary of the Leine
 Leine, passes the Sackwald a few kilometres away to the southwest, southern tributary of the Aller
 Riehe, rises in the southeastern part of the Sackwald, southwestern tributary of the Lamme
 Winzenburger Bach, rises in the southern part of the Sackwald, eastern tributary of the Leine

Villages 
Amongst the villages on the edge of the Sackwald are: 
 Adenstedt in the catchment area of the Riehe, north-northeast of the Sackwald
 Alfeld on the Leine, northwest of the Sackwald
 Bad Gandersheim on the Gande, ein few kilometres southeast of the Sackwald
 Everode in the catchment area of the Leine, west of the Sackwald
 Freden on the Leine, south-southwest of the Sackwald
 Lamspringe on the Lamme, east of the Sackwald
 Winzenburg on the Winzenburger Bach, south of the Sackwald
 Woltershausen in the catchment area of the Riehe, east of the Sackwald

Points of interest 
Apart from the forested landscape itself, the points of interest in the Sackwald include the ruins of a Frankish mission station on the Hohe Schanze, the ruins of Winzenburg Castle on the Winzenberg and the cultural monument of Tiebenburg on the  Tiebenberg. Also worth seeing are the ruins of the Schulenburg Chapel, which stand northeast of Langenholzen and north of Sack (both in the borough of Alfeld) at about 185 metres above sea level on the southwestern edge of the neighbouring Vorberge.

Sources 
 Ernst Andreas Friedrich: Naturdenkmale Niedersachsens. Hanover, 1980, .

Hill ranges of Lower Saxony
Forests and woodlands of Lower Saxony
Hildesheim (district)
Natural regions of the Weser-Leine Uplands